Hyperbola GNU/Linux-libre is a Linux distribution for the i686 and x86-64 architectures. It is based on Arch Linux snapshots and Debian development. It includes the GNU operating system components and the Linux-libre kernel instead of the generic Linux kernel. Hyperbola GNU/Linux-libre is listed by the Free Software Foundation as a completely free operating system, true to their Free System Distribution Guidelines.

History
Hyperbola was born at the 17th annual Fórum Internacional Software Livre (Porto Alegre, Brazil).

On 5 August 2017, support for systemd was dropped in favor of OpenRC as its default init system to support the Init Freedom Campaign begun by Devuan.

On 6 December 2018, Hyperbola was the first Brazilian distribution recognized as a completely free project by GNU, making it part of the FSF list of free distributions.

On 23 September 2019, Hyperbola announced its first release with the implementation of Xenocara as its default display server for the X Window System and LibreSSL as its default system cryptography library.

In December 2019, Hyperbola announced that it would cease to be a Linux distribution, and that it would become a hard fork of OpenBSD with GPL-licensed code. The project cited objections to recent developments in the Linux kernel that they deemed to be an  "unstable path", including inclusion of optional support for High-bandwidth Digital Content Protection, the kernel "being written without security in mind", GNU and "core" components with non-optional dependencies, and endorsement of the Rust programming language — due to objections to the Mozilla Foundation trademarks policy and "a centralized code repository that is more prone to cyber attack and generally requires internet access to use". Support for the Linux version will cease at the end of its current release's lifecycle.

Social contract
Hyperbola has established a Social Contract. The Hyperbola Social Contract commits the project to the free software community, free culture, privacy, stability, init freedom, and to follow Arch-based system packaging, yet under the principles of stability, development and maintenance of Debian. Under the covenant are included the GNU Free System Distribution Guidelines.

Development

Packaging guidelines
Hyperbola has established packaging guidelines. The Hyperbola Packaging Guidelines contain a collection of common issues and the severity that should be placed on them for its development, such as backporting, package releases and Debian patches.

Codenames
Hyperbola aliases its stable releases using galaxy names as codenames chosen from the list of nearest known galaxies of the Milky Way, in ascending order of distance.

Release cycle

A stable version of Hyperbola gets released approximately every three years. Point releases will be available every few months. For each Hyperbola release, it will receive two years of extra security updates after its End Of Life (EOL). However, no further point releases will be made. Each Hyperbola release will receive five years of security support in total.

Installation

Hyperbola GNU/Linux-libre can be installed from scratch using the live images. Prior to the version 0.4, migrating from an existing Arch-based system was supported.

See also

Comparison of Linux distributions
GNU/Linux naming controversy
GNU variants
List of distributions based on Arch
List of Pacman-based distributions

References

External links

 
 

2017 software
Arch-based Linux distributions
Free software only Linux distributions
Linux distributions without systemd
Pacman-based Linux distributions
Linux distributions